The Oriental Theater, is a historic theater is located in Berkeley neighborhood of Denver, Colorado. Since opening in 1927, the venue has hosted numerous functions both private and public. The venue allows minors and consumers over 21 to function together, rather than having to be separated by their ages. It is currently used as a live music venue and is registered with the National Register of Historic Places.

History 
The Oriental Theater was built in 1927 and originally started off showcasing movie films. In 1960 the owners decided to put in new seats and carpet to attract customers  but due to the lack of response the theater had to close. 

After 45 years of inactivity, it was purchased by Scott Labarbera, in 2005, and turned into a live music venue. Labarbera was owner from 2005 and sold to Jim Norris and 3 Kings Tavern Entertainment in 2009. In 2011 Scott Labarbera, Andy Bercaw and Lara Moore bought back the theater but the opening was shortly lived. They were forced to shut down for renovation to the building due to part of the structure almost falling on concert goers during an event. In 2012 after the much needed fixes and help of investors, the venue was re-opened. Presently the theater host's some of Denver's largest events with local and national acts and has the same owner.

Performers 

The AAA Girls
Aaron Carter
Bill Frisell
Leon Russell
Doug Kershaw
Marty Stuart
Todd Rundgren
Sage Francis
Jesse Dayton
Todd Snider
Colton Dixon
My Life with the Thrill Kill Kult
Hot Tuna
Tommy Castro
Carnage the Executioner
Matt Bellassai
Stryker & MFT

References

External links 

 

Theatres on the National Register of Historic Places in Colorado
Buildings and structures in Denver
National Register of Historic Places in Denver
Theatres completed in 1927
Music venues in Colorado
Theatres in Denver
Late 19th and Early 20th Century American Movements architecture